HMS Yarmouth was a  light cruiser of the Royal Navy launched on 12 April 1911 from the yards of the London & Glasgow Co.  She was part of the Weymouth subgroup.

On the outbreak of the First World War, Yarmouth was on the China Station, and later in 1914, she was involved in the hunt for the German commerce raider .  In October that year she captured two German colliers.  She returned to home waters in December 1914 and was assigned to the 2nd Light Cruiser Squadron of the Grand Fleet, and in February 1915 to 3rd Light Cruiser Squadron. Whilst serving with this squadron, she took part in the Battle of Jutland on 31 May-1 June 1916.

On 28 June 1917, Royal Naval Air Service Flight Commander F. J. Rutland took off in a Sopwith Pup from a flying-off platform mounted on the roof of one of Yarmouths gun turrets, the first such successful launch of an aircraft in history.  On 21 August a Pup flown by Flight Sub-Lieutenant B. A. Smart flown from Yarmouth shot down the Zeppelin L 23 near Bovbjerg.

HMS Yarmouth re-commissioned at Colombo, Ceylon, in June, 1918. She served as part of the 3rd Light Cruiser Squadron. She re-commissioned at Colombo again on 21st March, 1919. The flag of Rear-Admiral The Hon. Edward Stafford Fitzherbert, CB, Commander-in-Chief on the Africa Station, was flown in Yarmouth temporarily. In 1919, she stopped at Tristan da Cunha, the first ship in ten years, to inform the islanders of the outcome of World War I. After the war, she joined the 7th Light Cruiser Squadron on the South America Station.

Yarmouth was sold for scrapping on 2 July 1929 to the Alloa South Breaking Company, of Rosyth.

Notes

References
 
 Jane's Fighting Ships of World War One (1919), Jane's Publishing Company
 Ships of the Weymouth group

External links 

 Battle of Jutland Crew Lists Project - HMS Yarmouth Crew List

 

Town-class cruisers (1910) of the Royal Navy
Ships built in Govan
1911 ships
World War I cruisers of the United Kingdom